Michael Robert Ryan (born 26 December 1941 in Bannockburn, Stirlingshire) is a former long-distance runner, who was born in Scotland. He won the bronze medal for New Zealand in the men's marathon at the 1968 Summer Olympics held in Mexico City, Mexico.

Ryan was inducted into the New Zealand Sports Hall of Fame in 2008.

References 
 Mike Ryan at the New Zealand Olympic Committee
 
 
 

1941 births
New Zealand male long-distance runners
New Zealand male marathon runners
Athletes (track and field) at the 1966 British Empire and Commonwealth Games
Commonwealth Games bronze medallists for New Zealand
Olympic bronze medalists for New Zealand
Athletes (track and field) at the 1968 Summer Olympics
Olympic athletes of New Zealand
Living people
Commonwealth Games medallists in athletics
Medalists at the 1968 Summer Olympics
Olympic bronze medalists in athletics (track and field)
Medallists at the 1966 British Empire and Commonwealth Games